The May Thirtieth Movement Monument is an outdoor sculpture and memorial commemorating to the May Thirtieth movement, installed at People's Park in Shanghai, China.

Description and history

The steel sculpture was installed just south of Nanjing Road in the 1990s. It depicts a flame and the two characters for 五 and 卅. Behind the sculpture is a bas relief explaining, in Chinese, the events that took place in 1925.

Reception
In 2008, Shanghaiist wrote, "we wouldn't recommend it. The city's homeless population apparently fails to grasp the monument's historical richness and instead tend to use its relative seclusion to literally take a piss on their shared heritage. But, in the spirit of the monument, it's kind of fitting the way underclasses are making their voices heard. Power to the people, right on."

References

External links
 

1990s establishments in China
20th-century sculptures
Huangpu District, Shanghai
Outdoor sculptures in Shanghai
Steel sculptures in China